Elachista vinlandica is a moth of the family Elachistidae. It is found in Canada, where it has been recorded from Newfoundland.

References

vinlandica
Moths described in 1996
Moths of North America